Zigismunds Sirmais (born May 6, 1992 in Riga) is a Latvian javelin thrower. Sirmais achieved his best result of 86.66 while winning the 2016 European Athletics Championships.  He previously threw the world junior record of 84.69 m on June 22, 2011 in Bauska, Latvia. He is competing for the club Arkādija under coach Valentīna Eiduka.

Seasonal bests by year
2009 – 65.03
2010 – 82.27 
2011 – 84.69
2012 – 84.06
2013 – 82.77
2014 – 86.61
2015 – 79.37
2016 – 86.66

Achievements

References

External links

1992 births
Living people
Latvian male javelin throwers
Athletes from Riga
Athletes (track and field) at the 2012 Summer Olympics
Athletes (track and field) at the 2016 Summer Olympics
Olympic athletes of Latvia
European Athletics Championships medalists
Universiade medalists in athletics (track and field)
Universiade bronze medalists for Latvia
Medalists at the 2015 Summer Universiade